The Adams hemisphere-in-a-square is a conformal map projection for a hemisphere. It is a transverse version of the Peirce quincuncial projection, and is named after American cartographer Oscar Sherman Adams, who published it in 1925. When it is used to represent the entire sphere it is known as the Adams doubly periodic projection. Like many conformal projections, conformality fails at certain points, in this case at the four corners.

See also

 List of map projections
 Guyou hemisphere-in-a-square projection
 Doubly periodic function

References

Map projections
Conformal projections